Degenia is a monotypic plant genus in the family Brassicaceae containing the single species Degenia velebitica. The yellow-flowered plant is endemic to the Velebit and Kapela mountain ranges of Croatia. It is an endangered species and has had protected status since 1964.

Discovered by Árpád Degen in 1917, the species has since become a symbol of the region. Known in Croatian by the translation of the binomial name, it was depicted on the reverse of the Croatian 50 lipa coin, minted from 1993 to 2022.

References

External links

Brassicaceae
Monotypic Brassicaceae genera
Endemic flora of Croatia